Estádio do Mar is a multi-use stadium in Matosinhos, Portugal.  It is used mostly for football matches and is the home stadium of Leixões. The stadium seats 6,798 and was built in 1963 and inaugurated on 1 January 1964 with a match against Benfica, who won 4–0.

External links

 Frank Jasperneite page

References

Mar
Leixões S.C.
Sports venues in Porto District
Sports venues completed in 1964